Victor Gilbert (27 May 1905 – 6 December 1978) was a British sports shooter. He competed in the 50 m rifle event at the 1948 Summer Olympics.

References

1905 births
1978 deaths
British male sport shooters
Olympic shooters of Great Britain
Shooters at the 1948 Summer Olympics
Sportspeople from Bolton